I've Lost My Husband! (Italian: Ho perduto mio marito) is a 1937 Italian "white-telephones" romantic comedy film directed by Enrico Guazzoni and starring Paola Borboni, Nino Besozzi and Enrico Viarisio. It was based a play of the same title by  Giovanni Cenzato.

It was shot at the Cines Studios in Rome and on location in Valdagno in Northern Italy. The film's sets were designed by the art director Giorgio Pinzauti.

Plot
Valentina is in love with her friend Giuliano and wants him to marry her. In order for them to spend time together she tricks him into believing that she had recently married and lost her husband at the railway station. She persuades Giuliano to assist her in an extensive search for the missing husband, by the end of which he has fallen in love with her.

Cast
 Paola Borboni as Valentina 
 Nino Besozzi as Conte Giuliano Arenzi  
 Enrico Viarisio as Mattia  
 Romolo Costa as Ing. Zanni  
 Nicola Maldacea as Giuseppe  
 Vittorina Benvenuti as Signorina Adele 
 Vanna Vanni as Cecilia - sua figlia

See also

References

Bibliography 
 Clarke, David B. & Doel, Marcus A. Moving Pictures/Stopping Places: Hotels and Motels on Film. Lexington Books, 2009.

External links 
 

1937 films
Italian romantic comedy films
1937 romantic comedy films
1930s Italian-language films
Films directed by Enrico Guazzoni
Italian black-and-white films
Italian films based on plays
Cines Studios films
1930s Italian films